Seema Sastri is a 2007 Indian Telugu-language action comedy film directed by G. Nageswara Reddy. It stars Allari Naresh and Farjana. The film was released theatrically on 16 November 2007. It received mixed reviews from critics, who praised the humour, action sequences, and songs, but criticized the writing. It was later remade in Kannada as Super Shastri (2012). It was dubbed into Hindu as Guru Mahaguru.

Plot
Subramanyam Sastri falls in love with Surekha Reddy, who lives with her relatives in Hyderabad. After falling in love, Sastri gets to know that Surekha Reddy belongs to a popular factionist family in Rayala Seema. The rest of the story is all about how Subramanyam and his family members convince the factionists for the marriage in a humorous way.

Cast

 Allari Naresh as Subramanya Sastry
 Farjana as Surekha Reddy
 Ali as Lambodhara Sastry
 Jaya Prakash Reddy as Peddi Reddy
 L. B. Sriram as Shankar Sastry
 Krishna Bhagavan
 M. S. Narayana as Vaikunta Sastry
 Brahmanandam as Panthulu
 Dharmavarapu Subramanyam
 A. V. S
 Kovai Sarala
 Vijaya Rangaraju as Laxma Reddy
 Raghu Babu as Gangi Reddy
 Bhuvaneswari as Neelambari
 Venu Madhav as Groom
 Master Bharath as Bharatha Simha Reddy
 Rajitha
 Mumaith Khan as Cameo appearance
 Chevella Ravi as Cameo (popularly known as Bithiri Sathi)
 Mallikarjuna Rao as Cameo

Soundtrack
The soundtrack was composed by Vandemataram Srinivas and it contains 5 songs. Music of Allari Naresh’s latest film Seema Sastri was launched at a function arranged in Kalinga Cultural center, Banjara Hills on the evening of 28 August. This function is attended by VV Vinayak, EVV, Rajasekhar, Jeevitha, Vishnu, Naresh, G Srinivasa Reddy, Chavali Ramanjaneyulu etc. EVV and Rajasekhar jointly released the audiocassette and gave the first unit to VV Vinayak. VV Vinayak and Vishnu jointly released the audio CD and gave the first unit to EVV.
 "Indha Andamaina" - Karthik
 "Manasa Vacha" - Karunya, Suchitra
 "Fida Fida" - Viswa, Pooja
 "Mancham Vesi" - Jassie Gift, Kalpana
 "Ichothane" - Tippu, Malathi

Reviews
Idlebrain wrote:"If you can ignore illogical scenes and vulgarity, it is a decent comedy film that does not bore you". Telugucinema wrote:"Seema Shastry provides enough laughs and is good vasool for money. Despite some vulgar dialogues and illogical plotline and scenes, it gives entertainment". Fullhyderabad wrote:"Although Seema Sastry isn't the funniest movie ever made, it is worth a trip to the box office if you're in the mood for some lightweight timepass".

Remake
It went on to be remade in Kannada as Super Shastri.

References

External links
 

2007 films
Indian action comedy films
2000s masala films
Telugu films remade in other languages
Films set in Hyderabad, India
2000s Telugu-language films
2007 action comedy films
Films directed by G. Nageswara Reddy